Chalk Farm is a London Underground station near Camden Town in the London Borough of Camden. It is on the Edgware branch of the Northern line between Belsize Park and Camden Town stations. For ticketing purposes, Chalk Farm falls in Travelcard Zone 2. With slightly under five million entries and exits in 2011, Chalk Farm is one of the busiest stations on the Edgware branch of the Northern line.

History
The station was opened on 22 June 1907 by the Charing Cross, Euston & Hampstead Railway (CCE&HR). Trains originally operated between Golders Green and Charing Cross, with extensions to Edgware and Kennington in 1923–24 and 1926, respectively. All trains ran via the Charing Cross branch. As part of a comprehensive signing scheme, the 'UndergrounD' lettering was added in 1908.

With the subsequent extension of the City and South London Railway (C&SLR) to Camden Town in 1924, the CCE&HR and C&SLR were joined, allowing through running on the Bank branch and service as far south as Clapham Common, extending to Morden in 1926.

Station layout
Chalk Farm station lies at the intersection of Chalk Farm Road, Haverstock Hill (the northern extension of Camden High Street) and Adelaide Road, which create an angular intersection that forms the centre of the neighbourhood of the same name.

Architecture
Chalk Farm's narrow, wedge-shaped station building gives it the longest frontage of any of the stations designed by architect Leslie Green for the three tube lines owned by the Underground Electric Railways Company of London and opened in 1906 and 1907. It also has the shallowest lift shafts of any Underground station (21 ft). Station refurbishment by Tube Lines was completed in 2005. The station is a Grade II listed building.

Connections
London Buses routes 31, 168 and 393 and night routes N5, N28 and N31 serve the station.

Gallery

In popular culture
London Ska/Pop band Madness posed outside of Chalk Farm tube station for the covers of their no. 2 UK hit album Absolutely and no. 3 UK single Baggy Trousers.

References

External links

 London Transport Museum Photographic Archive
 
 

Northern line stations
Tube stations in the London Borough of Camden
Former Charing Cross, Euston and Hampstead Railway stations
Railway stations in Great Britain opened in 1907
Leslie Green railway stations
Grade II listed buildings in the London Borough of Camden
Grade II listed railway stations
London Underground Night Tube stations